Tennessee's 29th Senate district is one of 33 districts in the Tennessee Senate. It has been represented by Democrat Raumesh Akbari since 2018, succeeding fellow Democrat Lee Harris.

Geography
District 29 is based in Memphis, following the Mississippi River to cover parts of South and Downtown Memphis – including much of historic Beale Street – as well as Millington and other unincorporated Shelby County suburbs to the north.

The district is located almost entirely within Tennessee's 9th congressional district, with a very small section extending into the 8th district. It overlaps with the 84th, 85th, 86th, 87th, 90th, 91st, 93rd, and 99th districts of the Tennessee House of Representatives, and borders the states of Mississippi and Arkansas.

2018

2014

Federal and statewide results in District 29

References 

29
Shelby County, Tennessee